Eleonora Berlanda (born 4 April 1976) is a former Italian female middle-distance runner who competed at individual senior level at the 2005 World Championships in Athletics – Women's 1500 metres.

National titles
She won five national championships at individual senior level.
Italian Athletics Championships
800 m: 1995
1500 m: 2004, 2005, 2006
Italian Athletics Indoor Championships
800 m: 1995

References

External links
 

1976 births
Living people
Italian female middle-distance runners
Sportspeople from Bolzano
Athletics competitors of Fiamme Oro